Ellis Clary (September 11, 1916 – June 2, 2000), nicknamed "Cat", was an American professional baseball player, coach and scout. He played in the Major Leagues during World War II, when the talent pool was depleted due to the military draft.

Clary's pro playing career stretched over 19 seasons (1935–53). He made his MLB debut with the Washington Senators in 1942, and he hit .275 in 240 at-bats as an infielder. In 1943, he was traded during the season to the St. Louis Browns, where he became a reserve player. He was a member of St. Louis' only American League championship team, the 1944 Browns.

In 1945, Clary batted just .211. Despite his own poor performance, he blamed the team's struggles on one-armed outfielder Pete Gray. Clary was sent down to the minor league Toledo Mud Hens in 1946. His career big league batting average was .263 with one home run and 46 RBI in 223 games.

Following his playing career, Clary was a coach for the Senators for six seasons (1955–60), and then switched to scouting when the team relocated to Minneapolis–St. Paul. He scouted for the Twins for 24 years, then worked for the Chicago White Sox and Toronto Blue Jays as a special assignment scout until his 1993 retirement.

Clary is a member of the Valdosta/Lowndes County (Ga.) Sports Hall of Fame, the Charlotte Sports Hall of Fame, and the Georgia Sports Hall of Fame.

He died in Valdosta at age 83.

References

External links

1916 births
2000 deaths
Americus Cardinals players
Atlanta Crackers players
Baltimore Orioles (IL) players
Baseball players from Georgia (U.S. state)
Charlotte Hornets (baseball) players
Chattanooga Lookouts players
Chicago White Sox scouts
Greenville Spinners players
Major League Baseball first base coaches
Major League Baseball scouts
Major League Baseball second basemen
Major League Baseball third base coaches
Major League Baseball third basemen
Minnesota Twins scouts
People from Valdosta, Georgia
St. Louis Browns players
Sanford Lookouts players
Springfield Nationals players
Toledo Mud Hens players
Toronto Blue Jays scouts
Washington Senators (1901–1960) coaches
Washington Senators (1901–1960) players